The Complex of Sultan Bayezid II is a külliye located in Edirne, Turkey. It was built in 1488 by the Ottoman architect Mimar Hayruddin for the Sultan Bayezid II (reigned 1481–1512).

The complex contains a Dar al-Shifa (Turkish darüşşifa, "hospital, medical center"), and it remained in operation for four centuries from 1488 until the Russo-Turkish War (1877–78). The hospital was especially notable for its treatment methods for mental disorders, which included the use of music, water sound and scents.

The historic darüşşifa was incorporated into the structure of Edirne-based Trakya University in 1993, and converted into the Complex of Sultan Bayezid II Health Museum in 1997, a museum dedicated to the history of medicine and health matters in general. The complex was inscribed in the Tentative list of World Heritage Sites in Turkey in 2016.

Medical school

The health institution was a medical school. It ranked among the best 60 schools (madrasa) in the Ottoman Empire due to its high-paid scholar.

The medical school consisted of 18 student rooms and a classroom surrounding three sides of a courtyard with a shadirvan (fountain) in the middle. Famous Ottoman travel writer Evliya Çelebi (1611–after 1682) mentions in his book that the students of the medical school were mature physicians, who studied and discussed works of Ancient Greek philosophers, scientists and physicians such as Plato (428/427 or 424/423–348/347 BC), Socrates (470/469–399 BC), Philip of Opus, Aristotle (384–322 BC), Galen  (AD 129– c. 200/c. 216) and Pythagoras (c. 570 – c. 495 BC). The physicians, each being a specialist in a different field, tried to find out the best treatment by studying valuable scientific literature on medicine. The books of the medical school are archived in the hand-written books library of Selimiye Mosque today.

According to Evliya Çelebi, following daily wages were paid to the staff and students:
 Scholar (1): 60 akçe (silver coin) including holidays,
 Assistant (1): 7 akçe
 Library clerk (1): 2 akçe
 Servants (2): 2 akçe
 Students (18): 2 akçe. in addition to meeting of all their needs.

Gallery

References

External links

 Pictures of the mosque complex 

Buildings and structures completed in 1488
Buildings and structures in Edirne
Defunct hospitals
Ottoman architecture in Edirne
1877 disestablishments
Ottoman hospitals
Medical and health organizations based in Turkey
Mimar Hayruddin buildings
Bimaristans
Hospitals established in the 15th century